Ronald Clarke (born 26 March 1914 in Oxford, England - 12 June 1981 ) was a former international speedway who qualified for the Speedway World Championship finals twice.

Career summary
Clarke started his career with Lea Bridge and Crystal Palace Glaziers before the war. After the war he joined Odsal Boomerangs and stayed until 1957, including when the team changed to the Bradford Tudors in 1950. Clarke qualified for two World finals in succession and represented England nine times.

World final appearances
 1949 -  London, Wembley Stadium - 7th - 8pts
 1950 -  London, Wembley Stadium - 14th - 3pts

References

1914 births
1981 deaths
British speedway riders
English motorcycle racers
Belle Vue Aces riders
Bradford Tudors riders
Sheffield Tigers riders